Gary Milburn Tobian (born August 14, 1935) is a retired American diver. He competed in the 1956 and 1960 Summer Olympics and won a gold or silver medal in all his events: a gold in the 3 m springboard in 1960 and two silvers in the 10 m platform. Tobian held six Association of American Universities (AAU) titles in the platform, and won the springboard at the 1958 AAU Championships and at the 1959 Pan American Games. In 1978 he was inducted into the International Swimming Hall of Fame.

Tobian was a successful businessman. He was married to the Olympic swimmer Marley Shriver, but they later divorced.

See also
 List of members of the International Swimming Hall of Fame

References

1935 births
Living people
Sportspeople from Detroit
American male divers
Olympic gold medalists for the United States in diving
Divers at the 1956 Summer Olympics
Divers at the 1960 Summer Olympics
Pan American Games gold medalists for the United States
Divers at the 1955 Pan American Games
Divers at the 1959 Pan American Games
Medalists at the 1960 Summer Olympics
Medalists at the 1956 Summer Olympics
Olympic silver medalists for the United States in diving
Pan American Games bronze medalists for the United States
Pan American Games medalists in diving
Medalists at the 1955 Pan American Games
Medalists at the 1959 Pan American Games